An edict of toleration is a declaration, made by a government or ruler, and states that members of a given religion will not be persecuted for engaging in their religious practices and traditions. The edict implies tacit acceptance of the religion rather than its endorsement by the ruling power.

Edicts of toleration in history

Ancient times
 539 BCE – The Cyrus Cylinder, a clay document issued by Achaemenid Persian monarch Cyrus the Great declaring the restoration of the cult of Marduk in Babylon and the restorations of the temples of many peoples, including the Jews.
 311 CE – The Edict of Toleration by Galerius was issued in 311 by the Roman Tetrarchy of Galerius, Constantine and Licinius, officially ending the Diocletian persecution of Christianity.
 313 – Roman Emperors Constantine I and Licinius issued the Edict of Milan that legalized Christianity across the whole Empire.
 361 or 362 – Julian the Apostate, Roman emperor, issued a new edict that legalized / recognized all forms of Christianity, as well as Judaism and Paganism, across his empire.

Middle Ages
 1436 – The Compacts of Basel (valid for the Crown of Bohemia, previously declared in 1420 and approved by the Council of Basle in 1433) were formally accepted by Catholics and Utraquists (moderate Hussites) at an assembly in Jihlava and agreed by King and Emperor Sigismund, introducing a limited toleration and stating that "the word of God is to be freely and truthfully preached by the priests of the Lord, and by worthy deacons"

Early modern period
 1562 – The Edict of Saint-Germain was an edict of limited toleration issued by Catherine de' Medici (the regent for the young Charles IX of France) that ended insistent persecution of non-Catholics (mostly Huguenots).  The persecution was a result of the Concordat of Bologna (1516). A massacre of Huguenots a few weeks later began open hostilities in the French Wars of Religion (1562–1598).
 1568 – The Edict of Torda (or Turda), also known as the Patent of Toleration (Act of Religious Tolerance and Freedom of Conscience), was an attempt by King John II Sigismund of Hungary to guarantee religious freedom in his realm. Specifically, it broadened previous grants (to Roman Catholics, Lutherans, and Calvinists) to include the Unitarian Church, and allowed toleration (not legal guarantees) for other faiths.
 1573 – The Warsaw Confederation made all Christian confessions equal in the Polish–Lithuanian Commonwealth.
 1579 – The Union of Utrecht included a decree of toleration allowing personal freedom of religion. An additional declaration allowed provinces and cities that wished to remain Catholic to join the Union.
 1598 – The Edict of Nantes, issued by the King of France, Henry IV, was the formal religious settlement which ended the first era of the French Wars of Religion. The Edict granted to French Huguenots legal recognition as well as limited religious freedoms, including: freedom of public worship, the right of assembly, rights of admission to public offices and universities, and permission to maintain fortified towns. The Edict of Nantes, however, would be revoked in 1685 by Henry IV's grandson, Louis XIV, who once again proclaimed Protestantism to be illegal in France through the Edict of Fontainebleau.
 1609 – The Letter of Majesty by King of Bohemia and Emperor Rudolph II, valid for the Kingdom of Bohemia and Duchies of Silesia, introducing freedom of religion and religious toleration for all (including non-privileged classes, i.e. peasants etc.)
 1649 – Maryland Toleration Act in the early American colony Province of Maryland, also known as the Act Concerning Religion, was passed by Maryland's colonial assembly mandating religious tolerance for Catholicism. It was the second law requiring religious tolerance in the British North American colonies and created the first legal limitations on hate speech in the world. The Calvert family, who founded Maryland partly as a refuge for English Catholics, sought enactment of the law to protect Catholic settlers and those of other religions that did not conform to the dominant Anglicanism of Britain and her colonies. The Act was revoked in 1654, before being reinstated again, and finally, repealed permanently in 1692 following the Glorious Revolution. The Maryland Toleration Act influenced related laws in other colonies and was an important predecessor to the First Amendment to the United States Constitution, which enshrined religious freedom in American law over a century later.
 1664 – Edict of Toleration in the Electorate of Brandenburg (now in Germany), tolerance of the Protestant denominations with each other
 1685 – Edict of Potsdam, for reform of Huguenots in Lutheran Prussian Kingdom
 1689 – Parliament in England passes the Act of Toleration protecting Protestants with Roman Catholics intentionally excluded
 1692 – The Kangxi Emperor of the Qing Dynasty issued the Chinese Edict of Toleration on 22 March, recognizing the Roman Catholic Church, barring attacks on their churches and missions, and legalizing the practice of Christianity by Chinese people.
 1712 – Tolerance Act of Ernst Casimir in Büdingen. It guaranteed vollkommene Gewissensfreiheit (complete freedom of conscience) and demanded in return, the civil authorities and subjects both in their homes to behave as honorable, decent and Christian. The real aim was to counteract the war and plague which had caused the population decline.
 1773 – Tolerance Edict of Catherine II of Russia, in response to domestic political disputes with the Muslim Tatars. In the tolerance edict, she promised the toleration of all religious denominations in the Russian Empire, except for the large number of Jews who came under Russian rule after the First partition of Poland.
 1781/82 – A Patent of Toleration and linked 1782 Edict of Tolerance (for Jews) issued by the Holy Roman Emperor, Joseph II, extended religious freedom to non-Catholic Christians living in Habsburg lands, including: Lutherans, Calvinists, and the Greek Orthodox. However, in the end, Joseph's rescinded his own toleration patent while on his deathbed.
 1784 – Tolerance Edict of Elector Clemens Wenceslaus of Saxony, meant toleration of Protestants in the Electorate of Trier.
 1787 – The Edict of Versailles, issued by Louis XVI of France, ended persecution of non-Catholics – including Huguenots and Jews.
 1791 – Freedom of religion codified in the 1st Amendment of the Constitution of the United States.

Late modern period
 1812 – Friedrich Wilhelm III of Prussia, extended by the Prussian Jews Edict, the rights of Jews already in the old Prussian parts of the country eingebürgeten Jews.
 1839 – Edict of Toleration (Hawaii), which is issued by Kamehameha III to allow Catholic missionaries in addition to Protestants.
 1844 – Edict of Toleration, seen as beginning the process of allowing Jews to return to the Holy Land. It reduces punishments for apostasy from death.
 1847 – Tolerance Edict of King Frederick William IV of Prussia – among other things, religious disaffiliation is allowed.

20th century
 1905 – Edict of Toleration issued by Tsar Nicholas II of Russia gives legal status to religions not of the Russian Orthodox Church. Followed by the edict of 30 October 1906 giving legal status to schismatics and sectarians of the ROC.

See also
 French Wars of Religion
 Chinese Rites controversy
 Freedom of religion
 Religious tolerance

References

External links
 Medieval Edicts: Galerius and Constantine

 
History of religion
Religion in the Ancien Régime
Toleration
Freedom of religion
4th-century Christianity
Religion and law
Human rights instruments